The N.B. Palmer was a clipper ship owned by A.A. Low & Brother which was active in the China trade.

In 1858–1859 the N.B. Palmer, with her 28-year-old Captain Hingham tied the record of 82 days for the Shanghai to New York run.

N.B. Palmer was named after explorer, sailing captain, and ship designer Nathaniel Palmer. Along with the Sweepstakes, she was perhaps the most famous clipper built in New York's Westervelt yard. In China N.B. Palmer was known as "the Yacht", and with her nettings in the tops, brass guns, gold stripe, and her lavish entertainment on the Fourth of July and Washington's Birthday, she well deserved the title. A full-rigged model of the N.B. Palmer was exhibited at The Crystal Palace, London, in 1851, and attracted much attention as a fine example of the American clipper ship.

See also
 Nathaniel Palmer
 Jacob Aaron Westervelt
 A.A. Low
 Old China Trade

References

External links
 Captain Nathaniel B. Palmer House
 The N.B Palmer and Charles Porter Low

Further reading

History of foreign trade in China
Age of Sail merchant ships of the United States
Merchant ships of the United States
Ships built by Westervelt & MacKay
Individual sailing vessels
1851 ships
Extreme clippers